(born September 5, 1960) is a Japanese actor and voice actor.

Doraemon（1990）Nobi kasusasibi

Tokusatsu
Choushinsei Flashman (1986-1987) - Dai / Green Flash 
Chikyuu Sentai Fiveman (1990-1991) - First Captain Chevalier
Cosmo Toushinden Gingaiger: Dark Commander - Ginji / Gingablack 
Kaizoku Sentai Gokaiger (2012) - Dai / Green Flash

External links
Kihachirō Uemura's homepage 

Japanese male voice actors
Living people
1960 births
Place of birth missing (living people)